Scale is a studio album by British electronic musician Herbert. It was released via Studio !K7 on 29 May 2006.

Scale peaked at number 24 on the UK Independent Albums Chart and number 20 on the Billboard Top Dance/Electronic Albums chart.

Production
According to the liner notes, 635 objects were used to create the album. These include traditional instruments, such as violins and guitars, as well as other objects, such as breakfast cereal, gas pumps and coffins.

Critical reception

At Metacritic, which assigns a weighted average score out of 100 to reviews from mainstream critics, Scale received an average score of 81% based on 20 reviews, indicating "universal acclaim".

Pitchfork placed Scale at number 35 on the "Top 50 Albums of 2006" list. "Something Isn't Right" was ranked at number 17 on Pitchforks "Top 100 Tracks of 2006" list.

Track listing

2013 Special Edition extras:

Charts

References

External links
 

2006 albums
Matthew Herbert albums
Studio !K7 albums